Advanced Energy Industries, Inc. is an American multinational technology company headquartered in Denver, Colorado that develops precision power conversion, measurement and control technologies for the manufacture of semiconductors, flat panel displays, data storage products, telecommunications network equipment, industrial coatings, medical devices, solar cells and architectural glass.

General
Founded in 1981, Advanced Energy operates in regional centers in North America, Asia, and Europe, and offers global sales and support through direct offices, representatives, and distributors. The company has manufacturing facilities in the U.S., EMEA and Asia.

Advanced Energy produces products that are required for the manufacture of many plasma thin-film industries as well as semiconductor, flat panel displays, data storage, telecommunications networks, solar cells, medical devices and architectural glass.

It once manufactured and sold gas-system products for semiconductor, but withdrew from the market of gas-system products.

Products
Advanced Energy's Products include high and low voltage power systems, thermal measuring instruments, plasma power generators, remote plasma sources, electrostatic products, AC/DC and DC-DC power supplies, and thyristor power controls. The company also offers services globally.

Historical highlights and acquisitions
1981 Founded in Colorado, U.S.A. on May 5
1987 Japanese office opened
1990 German office opened
1993 UK office opened
1995 Listed on Nasdaq
1996 Korean office opened
1998 RF Power Products acquired
1999 Taiwan office opened
2000 China office opened
2001 Sekidenko acquired
2002 Aera Corporation acquired
2002 Litmas acquired
2002 Dressler (Dressler Hochfrequenztechnik GmbH & Dressler USA, Inc.) acquired
2007 Dressler site closed
2010 PV Powered acquired
2010 Mass flow controller business and gas cabinet business sold to Hitachi Metal (Japan). Temporarily withdrawing from the Japanese office.
2012 Solvix SA acquired
2013 RefuSol (Metzingen, Germany) acquired
2014 Power control modules (silicon-controlled rectifier controllers) section of AEG Power Solutions, Warstein-Belecke, Germany, acquired
2014 HiTek Power (UK) acquired
2014 UltraVolt (US) acquired
2017 Excelsys (IRL) acquired
2017 Japan office re-entry
2018 Israel office opened
2018 TREK Holdings (US) acquired
2018 Monroe Electronics (US) acquired
2018 LumaSense (US) acquired
2019 Divests Solar Inverter business
2019 Customer Solutions Center Karlstein am Main, Germany opened 
2019 Artesyn Embedded Power (US) acquired
2022 SL Power acquired
2020 Advanced Energy STEM Diversity Scholarship Program introduced
2021 TEGAM acquisition
2021 Versatile Power acquisition

See also 
 Solar inverter
 Switch mode power supply
 List of S&P 600 companies

References 

Companies based in Fort Collins, Colorado
Companies listed on the Nasdaq